Dodin is a surname. Notable people with the surname include:

 Lev Dodin (born 1944), Russian theater director
 Océane Dodin, French tennis player
 Reema Dodin, American political advisor
 Sharry Dodin, Seychellois sprinter

See also
 Dodin-Bouffant, fictional gourmet created by Marcel Rouff